Air Chief Marshal Chalermkiat Watanangura (?-14 April 1960) was a Thai air force officer and Commander of the Royal Thai Air Force. In 1960 Watanangura, his wife and sixteen other individuals were killed when the Royal Thai Air Force C-54 they were flying in crashed into Mount Wu Tse near Taipei, Taiwan after takeoff. Watanangura had been in Taipei attending a meeting of air chiefs from anti-communist governments from around the Pacific.

References

Chalermkiat Watanangura
1960 deaths
Chalermkiat Watanangura
Year of birth missing